The Dickson McCunn Trilogy is a series of three novels by John Buchan: Huntingtower (1922), Castle Gay (1930) and The House of the Four Winds (1935).  Penguin published an omnibus edition, The Adventures of Dickson McCunn, in 1994.

Huntingtower

Castle Gay

The House of the Four Winds

Characters

Dickson McCunn
Dickson McCunn is a fictional retired Glasgow grocer, the main character in the trilogy.

References

External links
 Gutenberg text of "Huntingtower"
 Gutenberg (Australia) text of "Castle Gay"
 Gutenberg (Australia) text of "The House of the Four Winds"

Novels by John Buchan
Scottish novels
Literary trilogies
Novel series
20th-century British novels
Novels set in Scotland